Timothy Sean Miles (born August 20, 1966) is an American college basketball coach who is the current head coach of the San Jose State Spartans men's basketball team. Miles previously served as the head coach of North Dakota State University, Colorado State University and the University of Nebraska. Miles is a graduate of the University of Mary.

Coaching career

Early career
Following his playing career at the University of Mary, Miles spent five seasons as an assistant coach at Northern State University, where the Wolves went to four NAIA II national tournaments and two national championship games.  In 1995, Miles left to accept his first head coaching job at NAIA II Mayville State. In both his seasons at Mayville State, Miles led the Comets to NDCAC Championships and the NAIA II National Tournament. In 1997, he accepted the Southwest Minnesota State job and led the Mustangs to four straight winning seasons including a historic season in 2001.  Leading Southwest State to their first NSIC championship and NCAA II regional berth. Southwest State won the North Central Region Championship and advanced to the NCAA II Elite Eight in Bakersfield, CA.

Miles took over at North Dakota State in the spring of 2001. Shortly thereafter, the school declared its intent to reclassify from NCAA II to transition to NCAA I.  The school would be ineligible for postseason play in its first five years of the transition, and was initially without a conference. On January 21, 2006, in just the school's second year in Division I, NDSU pulled off a shocking 62–55 upset of No. 12 Wisconsin at the Kohl Center. The Bison, starting three freshmen, ended Wisconsin's 27-game home winning streak against non-conference opponents.  Miles would be named the Division I Independent Coach of the Year by CBS Sportsline.

The following season the Bison pulled off another stunning upset, upsetting No. 8 Marquette in the championship game of the Blue and Gold Classic.  The Bison finished 20–8, their best season under Miles. North Dakota State joined the Summit League the year after Miles departed and the Bison made the NCAA Tournament under the guidance of new head coach Saul Phillips, who was previously Miles' assistant.

Colorado State
On March 22, 2007, Miles was named head coach at Colorado State, replacing Dale Layer. Miles inherited just two players from the 2007 roster, and as a result the program struggled immensely. After going winless in conference play in his first season, Miles' teams gradually improved over the following years.

In May 2011, after winning 19 games and guiding CSU to its seventh NIT appearance, he signed a 5-year contract extension with Colorado State.

The following season, the Rams defeated three ranked teams, all at home at Moby Arena. On January 28, CSU upset No. 13 San Diego State for the program's first win over a ranked opponent since 2004.  Just over a month later, the Rams stunned No. 18 New Mexico.  Then, on February 29, Colorado State rallied from a 15-point deficit at halftime to defeat No. 17 UNLV 66-59.  CSU finished 20–11 overall and 8–6 in the Mountain West, and was awarded an at-large bid to the NCAA Tournament.  It was CSU's first trip to the tournament since 2003 and their first at-large bid since 1990.  The Rams were the No. 11 seed in the West Regional and fell to No. 6 seed Murray State.

Nebraska
On March 24, 2012 Miles was named head coach at Nebraska, replacing Doc Sadler. Historically, the Cornhuskers have fielded one of the weakest high-major college programs in Division I, making the NCAA Tournament only six times before Miles' arrival and losing in the first round all six times. In 2014, Miles' second season, he coached the Huskers to the NCAA tournament, the school's first tournament berth since 1998, but the Cornhuskers lost to Baylor in the first round. After three seasons of single-digit conference wins, Miles guided the team to a 22–11 record in the 2017–18 season, achieving a program record 13 conference wins before falling in the first round of the NIT.  In 2018-19, Miles led Nebraska to a 10-2 start and another Top 25 ranking, before several injuries derailed Nebraska's NCAA Tournament hopes.  The Huskers made the quarterfinals of the Big Ten tournament but lost to Wisconsin 66-62.  The Huskers made the Big Ten quarter-finals five of seven years under Miles.  The NIT came calling again and the Huskers beat Butler, but lost at TCU to end their season at 19-17.  The Huskers ranked 10th nationally in single-season attendance, averaging 15,341 fans per game, as Nebraska was one of nine programs nationally to average at least 15,000 fans in each of the past six seasons.

Miles was relieved of his duties on March 26, 2019, finishing as the coach with the third-most wins in Nebraska men's basketball history. Nebraska athletic director Bill Moos stated that “Ultimately, we have not maintained a level of consistent success and stability on the court, and after a full review I have made the decision to move in another direction for the leadership of our program.”

San Jose State

On April 6, 2021, Miles was hired as the head men's basketball coach at San Jose State University. On November 11, 2021, Miles got his 400th career win
against Cal State Fullerton.

Broadcasting
During his time away from coaching, Miles served as an analyst for the Big Ten Network, Fox Sports, and FS1.

Head coaching record

References

1966 births
Living people
American men's basketball coaches
American men's basketball players
Basketball coaches from South Dakota
Basketball players from South Dakota
College men's basketball head coaches in the United States
Colorado State Rams men's basketball coaches
Mary Marauders men's basketball players
Mayville State Comets men's basketball coaches
Nebraska Cornhuskers men's basketball coaches
North Dakota State Bison men's basketball coaches
Northern State Wolves men's basketball coaches
People from Doland, South Dakota
San Jose State Spartans men's basketball coaches
University of Mary alumni